Andrew John Gwynne (born 4 June 1974) is a British politician who has served as Member of Parliament (MP) for Denton and Reddish since 2005. A member of the Labour Party, he has been Shadow Minister for Public Health since 2021 and previously from 2015 to 2016.

Gwynne served in the shadow cabinet of Jeremy Corbyn as Shadow Minister without Portfolio from 2016 to 2017. He was Shadow Secretary of State for Communities and Local Government and Labour Party Co-National Campaign Coordinator from 2017 to 2020.

Early life 
Born and brought up in Manchester, Gwynne was educated at Egerton Park Community High School (now called Denton Community College) in Denton, Tameside College of Technology in Ashton-under-Lyne, North East Wales Institute of Higher Education in Wrexham from 1992 to 1995 and the University of Salford from 1995 to 1998, earning a BA in Politics and Contemporary History.

Early political career 
At the age of 21 Gwynne became England's youngest councillor, when on 2 May 1996 he was elected to Tameside Metropolitan Borough Council, representing the Denton West Ward for the Labour Party. He was re-elected in 2000 and 2004, when he topped the poll in an "all out" election resulting from boundary changes in the borough. From 1998 to 2001 he chaired the Denton and Audenshaw District Assembly, and during 2003–04 he chaired the Resources and Community Services Scrutiny Panel.

Parliamentary career 
On 5 May 2005, at the age of 30, Gwynne became the youngest Labour MP in the 2005 Parliament. He is a member of the Unite Trade Union, the Co-operative Party and the Christians on the Left.

Government and frontbench posts 
He was appointed to the House of Commons Procedure Committee in June 2005 and, despite having only been elected six months earlier, on 10 November 2005, Gwynne was promoted to become a Parliamentary Private Secretary (PPS) to The Baroness Scotland of Asthal QC, as Minister of State for Criminal Justice and Offender Management at the Home Office. Between July 2007 and June 2009, he served as the Parliamentary Private Secretary to the Home Secretary, the Rt Hon Jacqui Smith MP. During this period he was also elected chair of Labour Friends of Israel, and led delegations of British MPs to Israel and the Palestinian territories. In June 2009, he became Parliamentary Private Secretary to the Secretary of State for Children, Schools and Families, then Ed Balls.

In October 2010 Gwynne became a Shadow Transport Minister with responsibility for passenger transport. In the Opposition front bench reshuffle of October 2011 he was appointed to the Shadow Health team by Ed Miliband. He was reappointed in September 2015, following the election of Jeremy Corbyn as party leader.

Gwynne is involved in the campaign for justice for the victims and families of the tainted blood scandal, reaffirming his commitment to the cause on World AIDS Day 2016. He said in 2016: "This scandal saw thousands of people die, and thousands of families destroyed through the negligence of public bodies".

Campaign activity
Gwynne took a leading role in organising Labour in the Oldham West and Royton by-election, occasioned by the death of long-serving MP and former junior minister Michael Meacher, in 2015. Gwynne said he hoped that "I can do the memory of Michael Meacher proud by helping to return a Labour MP for the seat". The Labour candidate Jim McMahon held the seat with a 10,000-plus majority and increased the party's share of the vote.

Andy Burnham chose Gwynne to run Burnham's mayoral campaign in Greater Manchester. After supporting Burnham's successful attempt to be selected as Labour's candidate over the favourite, Tony Lloyd, Gwynne remained as lead on Burnham's campaign in 2017.

Gwynne was asked to run Andy Burnham's re-election campaign as Mayor in 2021. The campaign focussed on transport improvements, clean air and housing. The campaign saw Andy Burnham increase his vote share and successfully win every ward in Greater Manchester.

He is a member and former Chair of Labour Friends of Israel. In 2018 Gwynne was named as a member of a Facebook group where individuals had shared anti-Semitic material. When a reporter confronted him about the group he stated that he had been added to it without his permission.

Debt Relief (Developing Countries) Act 
In 2010 Gwynne introduced the Debt Relief (Developing Countries) Act to restrict the activities of "vulture funds". Vulture funds buy the debts of poor countries, usually at a significant discount, and wait until the government has received relief from foreign creditors. As debtor countries have usually long defaulted on the loans, the vultures sue for the full debt – plus costs and interest – in courts around the world. This legislation prevents vulture funds from making exorbitant profits out of debt restructuring of heavily indebted poor countries, limiting how much vulture funds can sue for in UK courts to the amount they would have got if they had taken part in debt relief. The UK government has estimated that the Act will help to save 145 million pounds over six years. Similar legislation has now been passed in Jersey, Guernsey and the Isle of Man.

In 2016 Gwynne was invited to give a keynote speech on ways to tackle vulture funds and the damage they cause to developing nations at the 135th Inter-Parliamentary Union (IPU) in Geneva.

Appointment to Shadow Cabinet 
Gwynne was appointed to the Shadow Cabinet in October 2016, working in the opposition Cabinet Office team and becoming the spokesperson for the Shadow Cabinet in media appearances. In November 2016 he took a key role in helping to reform the proposed constituency boundaries in the Parliamentary Constituencies (Amendment) Bill drawn up by MP Pat Glass, and presented the Disability Equality Training (Taxi and Private Hire Vehicle Drivers) Bill, which sought to provide support to disabled users of taxi services. The Bill received cross party support, but due to a filibuster by two Conservative MPs, Sheryll Murray and Tom Pursglove, it was not voted on.

In 2017 Gwynne was appointed to lead Labour's campaign for the Copeland by-election following the resignation of Jamie Reed. Gwynne focused the campaign on Conservatives plans to cut services at West Cumberland Hospital and to move some hospital facilities, including maternity services, to Carlisle, 80 miles away.

In February 2017 Gwynne was appointed as the Labour Party's Co-National Campaign Coordinator while retaining some of his Cabinet Office duties and his role as a spokesperson. He shared this post with Ian Lavery.

During the 2017 general election campaign Gwynne clashed with Foreign Secretary Boris Johnson on Sky News, calling Johnson a "pillock" in a debate over Brexit policy.

He was re-elected in 2015 with a majority of 10,511. He was again re-elected in 2017 with an increased majority of 14,077, representing a 12.7% increase since the 2015 general election (63.5% share of the vote). Following the 2017 general election, Gwynne retained his role as the Labour Party's Co-National Campaign Coordinator, and was promoted to become Shadow Communities and Local Government Secretary, replacing Grahame Morris.

He was again re-elected in 2019 with a much reduced majority of 6,175, (50.06% share of the vote). Only 58.3% of the electorate turned out to vote in the Denton and Reddish constituency (ranked 53rd lowest turnout of 650 constituencies). In April 2020, one day after Keir Starmer was elected as the new Labour leader, Gwynne resigned from his position as Shadow Communities and Local Government Secretary.

Return to frontbench 
In the December 2021 opposition front bench reshuffle, he returned to his former role as Shadow Minister for Public Health.

Personal life
He is the son of sports commentator and reporter John Gwynne. He married Allison Dennis in March 2003 in Tameside, and they have two sons and a daughter. Allison Gwynne serves as a councillor for Denton North East Ward of Tameside Council.

Gwynne has talked about experiencing depression at points during his political life, as well as suffering a pulmonary embolism. In July 2020 it was revealed that he had COVID-19 for 16 weeks, a state called "long COVID".

References

External links

Meet the MP: Andrew Gwynne at BBC News Online

|-

|-

1974 births
Alumni of the University of Salford
Labour Party (UK) MPs for English constituencies
Labour Friends of Israel
Living people
People associated with Wrexham Glyndŵr University
People from Denton, Greater Manchester
Politicians from Manchester
UK MPs 2005–2010
UK MPs 2010–2015
UK MPs 2015–2017
UK MPs 2017–2019
UK MPs 2019–present